Woodland Park (formerly West Paterson) is a borough in Passaic County, in the U.S. state of New Jersey. As of the 2020 United States census, the borough's population was 13,484, an increase of 1,665 (+14.1%) from the 2010 census count of 11,819, which in turn reflected an increase of 832 (+7.6%) from the 10,987 counted in the 2000 census].

What is now Woodland Park was formed as a borough under the name West Paterson, by an act of the New Jersey Legislature on March 25, 1914, from portions of Little Falls Township, based on the results of a referendum held on May 1, 1914.

On November 4, 2008, the citizens of West Paterson voted to change the official name of the borough from West Paterson to Woodland Park. The new name retains the initials "W.P." and is a reference to the community's wooded areas. At a November 10, 2008 community meeting attended by 200 residents, a number of residents demanded that a recount be held if the official results showed that the measure had passed. In case the recount demand was unsuccessful, the group discussed filing a petition to change the name back to West Paterson, including discussion of how to raise the $33,000 needed to cover the cost of a special election in spring 2009 for voters to reconsider the name. By November 25, 2008, the provisional vote counts had been tallied, and the name change won by 25 votes. The Mayor and Council approved a resolution in December 2008, officially changing the borough's name to the Borough of Woodland Park, effective January 1, 2009. The name change is an attempt to "distance" itself from nearby urban Paterson, New Jersey, and all of the social ills associated with cities, including but not limited to urban blight, high crime, and drug addiction. A referendum held on November 3, 2009, affirmed the name change.

Geography
According to the United States Census Bureau, the borough had a total area of 3.08 square miles (7.97 km2), including 2.94 square miles (7.61 km2) of land and 0.14 square miles (0.36 km2) of water (4.51%).

Slippery Rock Brook is a tributary of the Passaic River that flows north as it drains part of the western flank of First Watchung Mountain.  Traveling south from its confluence with the Passaic River, it passes through the city of Paterson and the borough of Woodland Park.

The borough borders the Passaic County municipalities of Clifton, Little Falls, Paterson and Totowa.

Borough renaming
Borough residents voted in November 2008 to change the community's name to Woodland Park.  This close decision—the majority was only 33 votes according to early results—marked the fourth attempt to change the borough's historic name of West Paterson: voters rejected the names "Whispering Pines", "West Park," and "Garret Mountain" in 1989, 1995, and 2001 respectively.

Such a change is not unique in recent New Jersey history: Dover Township in Ocean County became Toms River Township in November 2006, and Washington Township in Mercer County became Robbinsville Township in November 2007.  The borough of East Paterson, located in adjacent Bergen County, changed its name to Elmwood Park in 1972.

Both East and West Paterson changed their names in hopes of dissociating themselves from the larger city of Paterson, which is significantly poorer and faces higher levels of crime, while preserving their E.P. and W.P. initials. In West Paterson, proponents of name change argued that their proposal would improve the borough's reputation and thus property values within the borough, as outsiders would be less likely to confuse it with Paterson. Opponents of the renaming saw no need to change, with businesses and the fire department citing the cost of changing references to the borough's name and the consequences of forgetting the community's history as West Paterson. The name change has been marred with accusations of racism and discrimination due to the city of Paterson's lower quality of life and diverse minority demographics. Some Paterson residents and advocates have jokingly suggested renaming Paterson to East Woodland Park and West Elmwood Park.

Residents who voted "No" to the name change petitioned the municipal government in an attempt to change the name back to West Paterson. A referendum was held on November 3, 2009, and the proposal was defeated by 2,248 votes to 2,216.

There is an unincorporated area called Woodland Park in the city of Summit, in Union County, adjacent to New Providence.

Economy
Cytec Industries is a specialty chemicals and materials technology company. Cytec was created in a 1993 spin off of American Cyanamid's industrial chemicals businesses. In July 2015, Solvay S.A. announced its intent to acquire Cytec for a purchase price of US$5.5 billion.

North Jersey Media Group, owned by Gannett, is the parent company of The Record and Herald News newspapers. The company relocated the operations of the Herald News to Woodland Park in 1999, and shifted its staff at The Record from Hackensack to Woodland Park from 2008 through 2010.

Parks and recreation
Garret Mountain Reservation is a county park covering . The park is primarily within Woodland Park, but it also extends into the cities of Paterson and Clifton.

Rifle Camp Park is a county park covering  located mostly within Woodland Park, but its eastern edge extends into Clifton as well. The park includes hiking trails, an observatory, nature center, fitness trail, amphitheater, a bird watching blind, and an overnight camping facility for local scout organizations.

Demographics

2010 census

The Census Bureau's 2006–2010 American Community Survey showed that (in 2010 inflation-adjusted dollars) median household income was $67,250 (with a margin of error of +/− $8,035) and the median family income was $75,080 (+/− $7,661). Males had a median income of $48,514 (+/− $6,624) versus $41,659 (+/− $6,602) for females. The per capita income for the borough was $31,623 (+/− $3,252). About 5.6% of families and 6.6% of the population were below the poverty line, including 7.6% of those under age 18 and 9.1% of those age 65 or over.

Same-sex couples headed 32 households in 2010, a 60% increase from the 20 counted in 2000.

2000 census
As of the 2000 United States census there were 10,987 people, 4,397 households, and 3,025 families residing in the borough. The population density was 3,715.5 people per square mile (1,433.1/km2). There were 4,497 housing units at an average density of 1,520.8 per square mile (586.6/km2). The racial makeup of the borough was 86.53% White, 3.16% African American, 0.08% Native American, 3.83% Asian, 0.04% Pacific Islander, 3.17% from other races, and 3.19% from two or more races. Hispanic or Latino of any race were 10.06% of the population.

As of the 2000 census, 34.3% of Woodland Park residents were of Italian ancestry, the 18th-highest percentage of any municipality in the United States, and seventh-highest in New Jersey, among all places with more than 1,000 residents identifying their ancestry.

There were 4,397 households, out of which 26.9% had children under the age of 18 living with them, 53.9% were married couples living together, 10.8% had a female householder with no husband present, and 31.2% were non-families. 25.5% of all households were made up of individuals, and 8.2% had someone living alone who was 65 years of age or older. The average household size was 2.49 and the average family size was 3.01.

In the borough the population was spread out, with 19.6% under the age of 18, 7.8% from 18 to 24, 33.9% from 25 to 44, 23.4% from 45 to 64, and 15.3% who were 65 years of age or older. The median age was 38 years. For every 100 females, there were 92.8 males. For every 100 females age 18 and over, there were 90.3 males.

The median income for a household in the borough was $60,273, and the median income for a family was $67,292. Males had a median income of $47,389 versus $36,814 for females. The per capita income for the borough was $29,758. About 3.2% of families and 3.4% of the population were below the poverty line, including 5.0% of those under age 18 and 3.0% of those age 65 or over.

Government

Local government
The Borough of Woodland Park was chartered by the State of New Jersey to function under the Faulkner Act (formally known as the Option Municipal Charter Law) within the Small Municipality form of government (Plan C), implemented by direct petition as of January 1, 1967. The borough is one of 18 municipalities (of the 564) statewide that use this form of government. The governing body is comprised of the Mayor and the Borough Council, with all positions elected at-large on a partisan basis as part of the November general election. The Mayor is elected directly by the voters to a three-year term of office. The Borough Council is comprised of six members elected to serve three-year terms on a staggered basis, with elections take place in a three-year cycle, with the mayor elected one year and three council seats up for election in the second and third years in the cycle. A government reorganization takes place on January 1 of every year, at which time a mayor-elect or newly elected council members are sworn in.

, the Mayor of Woodland Park is Democrat Keith Kazmark, whose term of office ends December 31, 2023. Members of the Woodland Park Borough Council are Michael Sica (D, 2025), Vincent Bennett DeCesare (D, 2024), Tina Gatti (D, 2024), Christine Tiseo (D, 2025), Tracy Kallert (D, 2024), and Sam Yodice, Jr. (D, 2025).

In May 2022, the Borough Council selected Adam Chaabane from a list of three candidates nominated by the Democratic municipal committee to fill the seat expiring in December 2022 that had been held by Joseph Spinelli who resigned after serving more two decades in office.

In 2012, Borough resident Matthew La Corte was fined for his planting of a political lawn sign. After nationwide backlash towards the borough and a series of court hearings, the borough agreed to drop the case and waive the nearly $24,000 in fines that had accumulated at $100 per day for each day the signs were up.

Federal, state and county representation
Woodland Park is located in the 11th Congressional District and is part of New Jersey's 40th state legislative district. Prior to the 2011 reapportionment following the 2010 Census, Woodland Park had been in the 34th state legislative district.

 

Passaic County is governed by Board of County Commissioners, comprised of seven members who are elected at-large to staggered three-year terms office on a partisan basis, with two or three seats coming up for election each year as part of the November general election in a three-year cycle. At a reorganization meeting held in January, the board selects a Director and Deputy Director from among its members to serve for a one-year term. 
, Passaic County's Commissioners are 
Director Bruce James (D, Clifton, term as commissioner ends December 31, 2023; term as director ends 2022),
Deputy Director Cassandra "Sandi" Lazzara (D, Little Falls, term as commissioner ends 2024; term as deputy director ends 2022),
John W. Bartlett (D, Wayne, 2024),
Theodore O. "T.J." Best Jr. (D, Paterson, 2023),
Terry Duffy (D, West Milford, 2022),
Nicolino Gallo (R, Totowa, 2024) and 
Pasquale "Pat" Lepore (D, Woodland Park, 2022).
Constitutional officers, elected on a countywide basis are
County Clerk Danielle Ireland-Imhof (D, Hawthorne, 2023),
Sheriff Richard H. Berdnik (D, Clifton, 2022) and 
Surrogate Zoila S. Cassanova (D, Wayne, 2026).

Politics
As of March 2011, there were a total of 7,930 registered voters in Woodland Park, of which 2,309 (29.1% vs. 31.0% countywide) were registered as Democrats, 1,448 (18.3% vs. 18.7%) were registered as Republicans and 4,171 (52.6% vs. 50.3%) were registered as Unaffiliated. There were 2 voters registered as Libertarians or Greens. Among the borough's 2010 Census population, 67.1% (vs. 53.2% in Passaic County) were registered to vote, including 83.6% of those ages 18 and over (vs. 70.8% countywide).

In the 2012 presidential election, Democrat Barack Obama received 55.4% of the vote (3,119 cast), ahead of Republican Mitt Romney with 43.9% (2,471 votes), and other candidates with 0.8% (44 votes), among the 5,714 ballots cast by the borough's 8,489 registered voters (80 ballots were spoiled), for a turnout of 67.3%. In the 2008 presidential election, Democrat Barack Obama received 2,897 votes (49.0% vs. 58.8% countywide), ahead of Republican John McCain with 2,782 votes (47.0% vs. 37.7%) and other candidates with 68 votes (1.1% vs. 0.8%), among the 5,918 ballots cast by the borough's 8,031 registered voters, for a turnout of 73.7% (vs. 70.4% in Passaic County). In the 2004 presidential election, Democrat John Kerry received 2,686 votes (48.6% vs. 53.9% countywide), ahead of Republican George W. Bush with 2,642 votes (47.8% vs. 42.7%) and other candidates with 37 votes (0.7% vs. 0.7%), among the 5,531 ballots cast by the borough's 7,506 registered voters, for a turnout of 73.7% (vs. 69.3% in the whole county).

In the 2013 gubernatorial election, Republican Chris Christie received 59.4% of the vote (2,188 cast), ahead of Democrat Barbara Buono with 39.7% (1,461 votes), and other candidates with 0.9% (32 votes), among the 3,769 ballots cast by the borough's 8,648 registered voters (88 ballots were spoiled), for a turnout of 43.6%. In the 2009 gubernatorial election, Republican Chris Christie received 2,165 votes (45.3% vs. 43.2% countywide), ahead of Democrat Jon Corzine with 2,151 votes (45.0% vs. 50.8%), Independent Chris Daggett with 238 votes (5.0% vs. 3.8%) and other candidates with 64 votes (1.3% vs. 0.9%), among the 4,776 ballots cast by the borough's 7,814 registered voters, yielding a 61.1% turnout (vs. 42.7% in the county).

Education
Students in public school for kindergarten through eighth grade are educated by the Woodland Park School District. As of the 2018–19 school year, the district, comprised of three schools, had an enrollment of 1,080 students and 88.1 classroom teachers (on an FTE basis), for a student–teacher ratio of 12.3:1. Schools in the district (with 2018–19 enrollment data from the National Center for Education Statistics) are 
Charles Olbon School with 368 students in grades K–2, 
Beatrice Gilmore School with 217 students in grades 3–4 and 
Memorial Middle School with 493 students in grades 5–8.

For ninth through twelfth grades, public school students attend Passaic Valley Regional High School, which also serves students from Little Falls and Totowa. The school facility is located in Little Falls. As of the 2018–19 school year, the high school had an enrollment of 1,186 students and 102.0 classroom teachers (on an FTE basis), for a student–teacher ratio of 11.6:1.

The Garret Mountain campus of Berkeley College is located in Woodland Park.

Transportation

Roads and highways

Public transportation
NJ Transit provides bus service to the Port Authority Bus Terminal in Midtown Manhattan on the 191 and 194 routes, with local service offered on the 704 route.

Notable people

People who were born in, residents of, or otherwise closely associated with Woodland Park include:
 Rick Cerone (born 1954), former MLB catcher who played most of his career with the New York Yankees
 Jeff Chase (born 1968), film and television actor who played for the Albany Firebirds of the Arena Football League
 Darius Hamilton (born 1993), defensive end for the Rutgers Scarlet Knights football team
 Keith Hamilton (born 1971), defensive tackle who played his entire 12-season career with the New York Giants
 Kendall Holt (born 1981), former professional boxer who competed from 2001 to 2013, and held the WBO junior welterweight title from 2008 to 2009
 Víctor Santos (born 1976), MLB relief pitcher who has played for the Detroit Tigers, Colorado Rockies, Texas Rangers, Milwaukee Brewers, Pittsburgh Pirates, Cincinnati Reds, and the Baltimore Orioles
 Natalia Shaposhnikova (born 1961), former Soviet gymnast and two-time Olympic champion who resides and coaches gymnastics in Woodland Park
 Omar Sheika (born 1977), former professional boxer and multiple time super middleweight world title challenger
 Frank Tripucka (1927–2013), former pro football quarterback

References

External links

 Borough of Woodland Park official website
 Woodland Park School District
 
 School Data for the West Paterson School District, National Center for Education Statistics
 Passaic Valley Regional High School
 Woodland Park Public Library
 WXWP-NJ Woodland Park and surrounding regional weather
 Woodland Park Business Association

 
1914 establishments in New Jersey
Boroughs in Passaic County, New Jersey
Faulkner Act (small municipality)
Populated places established in 1914